Weslley Silva Santos Rodrigues (born January 16, 1992) is a Brazilian football player for Kagoshima United.

Club statistics
Updated to 23 February 2017.

References

External links

Profile at Tokyo Verdy

1992 births
Living people
Brazilian footballers
J2 League players
J3 League players
Japan Football League players
SC Sagamihara players
Tokyo Verdy players
Brazilian expatriate footballers
Expatriate footballers in Japan
Association football defenders
Sportspeople from Salvador, Bahia